Joseph Booton may refer to:
Joseph F. Booton (1897–1983), American architect
Joseph Booton (actor) (born 1987), British actor